Renou is a French surname. Notable people with the surname include:

Antoine Renou (1731–1806), 18th–19th-century French painter and playwright
Franck Renou (born 1973), retired French football defender
Louis Renou (1896–1966), French ethnologist
René Renou (1952–2006), French winemaker

French-language surnames